Pisa (or ) is a city and comune in Tuscany, central Italy, straddling the Arno just before it empties into the Ligurian Sea. It is the capital city of the Province of Pisa. Although Pisa is known worldwide for its leaning tower, the city contains more than twenty other historic churches, several medieval palaces, and bridges across the Arno. Much of the city's architecture was financed from its history as one of the Italian maritime republics.

The city is also home to the University of Pisa, which has a history going back to the 12th century, the Scuola Normale Superiore di Pisa, founded by Napoleon in 1810, and its offshoot, the Sant'Anna School of Advanced Studies.

History

Ancient times
The most believed hypothesis is that the origin of the name Pisa comes from Etruscan and means 'mouth', as Pisa is at the mouth of the Arno river.

Although throughout history there have been several uncertainties about the origin of the city of Pisa, excavations made in the 1980s and 1990s found numerous archaeological remains, including the fifth century BC tomb of an Etruscan prince, proving the Etruscan origin of the city, and its role as a maritime city, showing that it also maintained trade relations with other Mediterranean civilizations.

Ancient Roman authors referred to Pisa as an old city. Virgil, in his Aeneid, states that Pisa was already a great center by the times described; the settlers from the Alpheus coast have been credited with the founding of the city in the 'Etruscan lands'. The Virgilian commentator Servius wrote that the Teuti founded the town 13 centuries before the start of the common era.

The maritime role of Pisa should have been already prominent if the ancient authorities ascribed to it the invention of the naval ram. Pisa took advantage of being the only port along the western coast between Genoa (then a small village) and Ostia. Pisa served as a base for Roman naval expeditions against Ligurians and  Gauls. In 89 BC,  became a municipium.

However, it was a maritime city, with ships sailing up the Arno. In the 90s AD, a baths complex was built in the city.

Late Antiquity and Early Middle Ages

During the last years of the Western Roman Empire, Pisa did not decline as much as the other cities of Italy, probably due to the complexity of its river system and its consequent ease of defence. In the seventh century, Pisa helped Pope Gregory I by supplying numerous ships in his military expedition against the Byzantines of Ravenna: Pisa was the sole Byzantine centre of Tuscia to fall peacefully in Lombard hands, through assimilation with the neighbouring region where their trading interests were prevalent. Pisa began in this way its rise to the role of main port of the Upper Tyrrhenian Sea and became the main trading centre between Tuscany and Corsica, Sardinia, and the southern coasts of France and Spain.

After Charlemagne had defeated the Lombards under the command of Desiderius in 774, Pisa went through a crisis, but soon recovered. Politically, it became part of the duchy of Lucca. In 860, Pisa was captured by vikings led by Björn Ironside. In 930, Pisa became the county centre (status it maintained until the arrival of Otto I) within the mark of Tuscia. Lucca was the capital but Pisa was the most important city, as in the middle of tenth century Liutprand of Cremona, bishop of Cremona, called Pisa  ("capital of the province of Tuscia"), and a century later, the marquis of Tuscia was commonly referred to as "marquis of Pisa". In 1003, Pisa was the protagonist of the first communal war in Italy, against Lucca. From the naval point of view, since the ninth century, the emergence of the Saracen pirates urged the city to expand its fleet; in the following years, this fleet gave the town an opportunity for more expansion. In 828, Pisan ships assaulted the coast of North Africa. In 871, they took part in the defence of Salerno from the Saracens. In 970, they gave also strong support to Otto I's expedition, defeating a Byzantine fleet in front of Calabrese coasts.

11th century

The power of Pisa as a  maritime nation began to grow and reached its apex in the 11th century, when it acquired traditional fame as one of the four main historical maritime republics of Italy.

At that time, the city was a very important commercial centre and controlled a significant Mediterranean merchant fleet and navy. Pisa was in continuous conflict with some 'Saracens' - a medieval term to refer to Arab Muslims - who had their bases in Corsica, for control of the Mediterranean. In 1017, Sardinian Giudicati were militarily supported by Pisa, in alliance with Genoa, to defeat the Saracen King Mugahid, who had settled a logistic base in the north of Sardinia the year before. This victory gave Pisa supremacy in the Tyrrhenian Sea. When the Pisans subsequently ousted the Genoese from Sardinia, a new conflict and rivalry was born between these major marine republics. Between 1030 and 1035, Pisa went on to defeat several rival towns in Sicily and conquer Carthage in North Africa. In 1051–1052, the admiral Jacopo Ciurini conquered Corsica, provoking more resentment from the Genoese. In 1063, Admiral Giovanni Orlandi, coming to the aid of the Norman Roger I, took Palermo from the Saracen pirates. The gold treasure taken from the Saracens in Palermo allowed the Pisans to start the building of their cathedral and the other monuments which constitute the famous .

In 1060, Pisa had to engage in their first battle with Genoa. The Pisan victory helped to consolidate its position in the Mediterranean. Pope Gregory VII recognised in 1077 the new "Laws and customs of the sea" instituted by the Pisans, and emperor Henry IV granted them the right to name their own consuls, advised by a council of elders. This was simply a confirmation of the present situation, because in those years, the marquis had already been excluded from power. In 1092, Pope Urban II awarded Pisa the supremacy over Corsica and Sardinia, and at the same time raising the town to the rank of archbishopric.

Pisa sacked the Tunisian city of Mahdia in 1088. Four years later, Pisan and Genoese ships helped Alfonso VI of Castilla to push El Cid out of Valencia. A Pisan fleet of 120 ships also took part in the First Crusade, and the Pisans were instrumental in the taking of Jerusalem in 1099. On their way to the Holy Land, the ships did not miss the occasion to sack some Byzantine islands; the Pisan crusaders were led by their archbishop Daibert, the future patriarch of Jerusalem. Pisa and the other  took advantage of the crusade to establish trading posts and colonies in the Eastern coastal cities of the Levant. In particular, the Pisans founded colonies in Antiochia, Acre, Jaffa, Tripoli, Tyre, Latakia, and Accone. They also had other possessions in Jerusalem and Caesarea, plus smaller colonies (with lesser autonomy) in Cairo, Alexandria, and of course Constantinople, where the Byzantine Emperor Alexius I Comnenus granted them special mooring and trading rights. In all these cities, the Pisans were granted privileges and immunity from taxation, but had to contribute to the defence in case of attack. In the 12th century, the Pisan quarter in the eastern part of Constantinople had grown to 1,000 people. For some years of that century, Pisa was the most prominent commercial and military ally of the Byzantine Empire, overcoming Venice itself.

12th century
In 1113, Pisa and Pope Paschal II set up, together with the count of Barcelona and other contingents from Provence and Italy (Genoese excluded), a war to free the Balearic Islands from the Moors; the queen and the king of Majorca were brought in chains to Tuscany. Though the Almoravides soon reconquered the island, the booty taken helped the Pisans in their magnificent programme of buildings, especially the cathedral, and Pisa gained a role of pre-eminence in the Western Mediterranean.

In the following years, the mighty Pisan fleet, led by archbishop Pietro Moriconi, drove away the Saracens after ferocious combats. Though short-lived, this success of Pisa in Spain increased the rivalry with Genoa. Pisa's trade with the Languedoc and Provence (Noli, Savona, Fréjus, and Montpellier) were an obstacle to Genoese interests in cities such as Hyères, Fos, Antibes, and Marseille.

The war began in 1119 when the Genoese attacked several galleys on their way to the motherland, and lasted until 1133. The two cities fought each other on land and at sea, but hostilities were limited to raids and pirate-like assaults.

In June 1135, Bernard of Clairvaux took a leading part in the Council of Pisa, asserting the claims of Pope Innocent II against those of Pope Anacletus II, who had been elected pope in 1130 with Norman support, but was not recognised outside Rome. Innocent II resolved the conflict with Genoa, establishing Pisan and Genoese spheres of influence. Pisa could then, unhindered by Genoa, participate in the conflict of Innocent II against king Roger II of Sicily. Amalfi, one of the maritime republics (though already declining under Norman rule), was conquered on August 6, 1136; the Pisans destroyed the ships in the port, assaulted the castles in the surrounding areas, and drove back an army sent by Roger from Aversa. This victory brought Pisa to the peak of its power and to a standing equal to Venice. Two years later, its soldiers sacked Salerno.

In the following years, Pisa was one of the staunchest supporters of the Ghibelline party. This was much appreciated by Frederick I. He issued in 1162 and 1165 two important documents, with these grants: Apart from the jurisdiction over the Pisan countryside, the Pisans were granted freedom of trade in the whole empire, the coast from Civitavecchia to Portovenere, a half of Palermo, Messina, Salerno and Naples, the whole of Gaeta, Mazara, and Trapani, and a street with houses for its merchants in every city of the Kingdom of Sicily. Some of these grants were later confirmed by Henry VI, Otto IV, and Frederick II. They marked the apex of Pisa's power, but also spurred the resentment of cities such as Lucca, Massa, Volterra, and Florence, thwarting their aim to expand towards the sea. Last, but not least, such a sudden and large increase of power by Pisa could only lead to another war with Genoa.

Genoa had acquired a largely dominant position in the markets of southern France. The war presumably began in 1165 on the Rhône, when an attack on a convoy, directed to some Pisan trade centres on the river, by the Genoese and their ally, the count of Toulouse, failed. Pisa, though, was allied to Provence. The war continued until 1175 without significant victories. Another point of attrition was Sicily, where both the cities had privileges granted by Henry VI. In 1192, Pisa managed to conquer Messina. This episode was followed by a series of battles culminating in the Genoese conquest of Syracuse in 1204. Later, the trading posts in Sicily were lost when the new Pope Innocent III, though removing the excommunication cast over Pisa by his predecessor Celestine III, allied himself with the Guelph League of Tuscany, led by Florence. Soon, he stipulated a pact with Genoa, too, further weakening the Pisan presence in southern Italy.

To counter the Genoese predominance in the southern Tyrrhenian Sea, Pisa strengthened its relationship with their traditional Spanish and French bases (Marseille, Narbonne, Barcelona, etc.) and tried to defy the Venetian rule of the Adriatic Sea. In 1180, the two cities agreed to a nonaggression treaty in the Tyrrhenian and the Adriatic, but the death of Emperor Manuel Comnenus in Constantinople changed the situation. Soon, attacks on Venetian convoys were made. Pisa signed trade and political pacts with Ancona, Pula, Zara, Split, and Brindisi; in 1195, a Pisan fleet reached Pola to defend its independence from Venice, but the Serenissima soon reconquered the rebel sea town.

One year later, the two cities signed a peace treaty, which resulted in favourable conditions for Pisa, but in 1199, the Pisans violated it by blockading the port of Brindisi in Apulia. In the following naval battle, they were defeated by the Venetians. The war that followed ended in 1206 with a treaty in which Pisa gave up all its hopes to expand in the Adriatic, though it maintained the trading posts it had established in the area. From that point on, the two cities were united against the rising power of Genoa and sometimes collaborated to increase the trading benefits in Constantinople.

13th century
In 1209 in Lerici, two councils for a final resolution of the rivalry with Genoa were held. A 20-year peace treaty was signed, but when in 1220, the emperor Frederick II confirmed his supremacy over the Tyrrhenian coast from Civitavecchia to Portovenere, the Genoese and Tuscan resentment against Pisa grew again. In the following years, Pisa clashed with Lucca in Garfagnana and was defeated by the Florentines at Castel del Bosco. The strong Ghibelline position of Pisa brought this town diametrically against the Pope, who was in a strong dispute with the Empire, and indeed the pope tried to deprive the town of its dominions in northern Sardinia.

In 1238, Pope Gregory IX formed an alliance between Genoa and Venice against the empire, and consequently against Pisa, too. One year later, he excommunicated Frederick II and called for an anti-Empire council to be held in Rome in 1241. On May 3, 1241, a combined fleet of Pisan and Sicilian ships, led by the emperor's son Enzo, attacked a Genoese convoy carrying prelates from northern Italy and France, next to the isle of Giglio (Battle of Giglio), in front of Tuscany; the Genoese lost 25 ships, while about a thousand sailors, two cardinals, and one bishop were taken prisoner. After this major victory, the council in Rome failed, but Pisa was excommunicated. This extreme measure was only removed in 1257. Anyway, the Tuscan city tried to take advantage of the favourable situation to conquer the Corsican city of Aleria and even lay siege to Genoa itself in 1243.

The Ligurian republic of Genoa, however, recovered fast from this blow and won back Lerici, conquered by the Pisans some years earlier, in 1256.

The great expansion in the Mediterranean and the prominence of the merchant class urged a modification in the city's institutes. The system with consuls was abandoned, and in 1230, the new city rulers named a capitano del popolo ("people's chieftain") as civil and military leader. Despite these reforms, the conquered lands and the city itself were harassed by the rivalry between the two families of Della Gherardesca and Visconti. In 1237 the archbishop and the Emperor Frederick II intervened to reconcile the two rivals, but the strains continued. In 1254, the people rebelled and imposed 12  ("People's Elders") as their political representatives in the commune. They also supplemented the legislative councils, formed of noblemen, with new People's Councils, composed by the main guilds and by the chiefs of the People's Companies. These had the power to ratify the laws of the Major General Council and the Senate.

Decline

The decline is said to have begun on August 6, 1284, when the numerically superior fleet of Pisa, under the command of Albertino Morosini, was defeated by the brilliant tactics of the Genoese fleet, under the command of Benedetto Zaccaria and Oberto Doria, in the dramatic naval Battle of Meloria. This defeat ended the maritime power of Pisa and the town never fully recovered; in 1290, the Genoese destroyed forever the Porto Pisano (Pisa's port), and covered the land with salt. The region around Pisa did not permit the city to recover from the loss of thousands of sailors from the Meloria, while Liguria guaranteed enough sailors to Genoa. Goods, however, continued to be traded, albeit in reduced quantity, but the end came when the Arno started to change course, preventing the galleys from reaching the city's port up the river. The nearby area also likely became infested with malaria. The true end came in 1324, when Sardinia was entirely lost to the Aragonese.

Always Ghibelline, Pisa tried to build up its power in the course of the 14th century, and even managed to defeat Florence in the Battle of Montecatini (1315), under the command of Uguccione della Faggiuola. Eventually, however, after a long siege, Pisa was occupied by Florentines in 1405. Florentines corrupted the capitano del popolo ("people's chieftain"), Giovanni Gambacorta, who at night opened the city gate of San Marco. Pisa was never conquered by an army. In 1409, Pisa was the seat of a council trying to set the question of the Great Schism. In the 15th century, access to the sea became more difficult, as the port was silting up and was cut off from the sea. When in 1494, Charles VIII of France invaded the Italian states to claim the Kingdom of Naples, Pisa reclaimed its independence as the Second Pisan Republic.

The new freedom did not last long; 15 years of battles and sieges by the Florentine troops led by Antonio da Filicaja, Averardo Salviati and Niccolò Capponi were made, but they failed to conquer the city. Vitellozzo Vitelli with his brother Paolo were the only ones who actually managed to break the strong defences of Pisa and make a breach in the Stampace bastion in the southern west part of the walls, but he did not enter the city. For that, they were suspected of treachery and Paolo was put to death. However, the resources of Pisa were getting low, and at the end, the city was sold to the Visconti family from Milan and eventually to Florence again. Livorno took over the role of the main port of Tuscany. Pisa acquired a mainly cultural role spurred by the presence of the University of Pisa, created in 1343, and later reinforced by the Scuola Normale Superiore di Pisa (1810) and Sant'Anna School of Advanced Studies (1987).

Pisa was the birthplace of the important early physicist Galileo Galilei. It is still the seat of an archbishopric. Besides its educational institutions, it has become a light industrial centre and a railway hub. It suffered repeated destruction during World War II.

Since the early 1950s, the US Army has maintained Camp Darby just outside Pisa, which is used by many US military personnel as a base for vacations in the area.

Geography

Climate
Pisa experiences a Mediterranean climate (Köppen climate classification Csa). The city is characterized by cool-mild winters and hot summers. This transitional climate allows Pisa to enjoy a summer almost devoid of rain, typical of central and southern Italy, as the summer (the driest season) experiences occasional rain showers. Rainfall peaks in the autumn.

Government

Culture

Gioco del Ponte
In Pisa there was a festival and game :fr:Gioco del Ponte (Game of the Bridge) which was celebrated (in some form) in Pisa from perhaps the 1200s down to 1807. From the end of the 1400s the game took the form of a mock battle fought upon Pisa's central bridge (Ponte di Mezzo). The participants wore quilted armor and the only offensive weapon allowed was the targone, a shield-shaped, stout board with precisely specified dimensions. Hitting below the belt was not allowed. Two opposing teams started at opposite ends of the bridge. The object of the two opposing teams was to penetrate, drive back, and disperse the opponents' ranks and to thereby drive them backwards off the bridge. The struggle was limited to forty-five minutes. Victory or defeat was immensely important to the team players and their partisans, but sometimes the game was fought to a draw and both sides celebrated. In 1927 the tradition was revived by college students as an elaborate costume parade. In 1935 Vittorio Emanuele III with the royal family witnessed  the first revival of a modern version of the game, which has been pursued in the 20th and 21st centuries with some interruptions and varying degrees of enthusiasm by Pisans and their civic institutions.

Festivals and cultural events
 Capodanno pisano (folklore, March 25)
 Gioco del Ponte (folklore)
 Luminara di San Ranieri (folklore, June 16)
 Maritime republics regata (folklore)
 Premio Nazionale Letterario Pisa
 Pisa Book Festival
 Metarock (rock music festival)
 Internet Festival
 San Ranieri regata (folklore)
 Turn Off Festival (house music festival)
 Nessiáh (Jewish cultural Festival, November)

Main sights

The medieval complex includes the above-mentioned four sacred buildings, the hospital and few palaces. All the complex is kept by the Opera (fabrica ecclesiae) della Primaziale Pisana, an old non profit foundation that operates since the building of the Cathedral (1063) to the maintenance of the sacred buildings. The area is framed by medieval walls kept by municipality administration.

Other sights include:
Sited on the square
Santo Stefano dei Cavalieri, church sited on Piazza dei Cavalieri, and also designed by Vasari. It had originally a single nave; two more were added in the 17th century. It houses a bust by Donatello, and paintings by Vasari, Jacopo Ligozzi, Alessandro Fei, and Pontormo. It also contains spoils from the many naval battles between the Cavalieri (Knights of St. Stephan) and the Turks between the 16th and 18th centuries, including the Turkish battle pennant hoisted from Ali Pacha's flagship at the 1571 Battle of Lepanto.
St. Sixtus. This small church, consecrated in 1133, is also close to the Piazza dei Cavalieri. It was used as a seat of the most important notarial deeds of the town, also hosting the Council of Elders. It is today one of the best preserved early Romanesque buildings in town.
St. Francis. The church of San Francesco may have been designed by Giovanni di Simone, built after 1276. In 1343 new chapels were added and the church was elevated. It has a single nave and a notable belfry, as well as a 15th-century cloister. It houses works by Jacopo da Empoli, Taddeo Gaddi and Santi di Tito. In the Gherardesca Chapel are buried Ugolino della Gherardesca and his sons.
San Frediano. This  church, built by 1061, has a basilica interior with three aisles, with a crucifix from the 12th century. Paintings from the 16th century were added during a restoration, including works by Ventura Salimbeni, Domenico Passignano, Aurelio Lomi, and Rutilio Manetti.
San Nicola. This medieval church built by 1097, was enlarged between 1297 and 1313 by the Augustinians, perhaps by the design of Giovanni Pisano. The octagonal belfry is from the second half of the 13th century. The paintings include the Madonna with Child by Francesco Traini (14th century) and St. Nicholas Saving Pisa from the Plague (15th century). Noteworthy are also the wood sculptures by Giovanni and Nino Pisano, and the Annunciation by Francesco di Valdambrino.
Santa Maria della Spina. A small white marble church alongside the Arno, is attributed to Lupo di Francesco (1230), is another excellent Gothic building.
San Paolo a Ripa d'Arno. The church was founded around 952 and enlarged in the mid-12th century along lines similar to those of the cathedral. It is annexed to the Romanesque Chapel of St. Agatha, with an unusual pyramidal cusp or peak.
San Pietro in Vinculis. Known as San Pierino, it is an 11th-century church with a crypt and a cosmatesque mosaic on the floor of the main nave. 
. This medieval borgo or neighborhood contains strolling arcades and the Lungarno, the avenues along the river Arno. It includes the Gothic-Romanesque church of San Michele in Borgo (990). There are at least two other leaning towers in the city, one at the southern end of central , the other halfway through the  riverside promenade.
Medici Palace. The palace was once a possession of the Appiano family, who ruled Pisa in 1392–1398. In 1400 the Medici acquired it, and Lorenzo de' Medici sojourned here.
. The botanical garden of the University of Pisa is Europe's oldest university botanical garden.
. The ("Royal Palace"), once belonged to the Caetani patrician family. Here Galileo Galilei showed to Grand Duke of Tuscany the planets he had discovered with his telescope. The edifice was erected in 1559 by Baccio Bandinelli for Cosimo I de Medici, and was later enlarged including other palaces. The palace is now a museum.
. This palace is a 14th-century Gothic building, and now houses the offices of the municipality. The interior shows frescoes boasting Pisa's sea victories.
.
Mural . A modern mural, the last public work by Keith Haring, on the rear wall of the convent of the Church of Sant'Antonio, painted in June 1989.

Museums
: exhibiting among others the original sculptures of Nicola Pisano and Giovanni Pisano and the treasures of the cathedral.
: showing the sinopias from the camposanto, the monumental cemetery. These are red ocher underdrawings for frescoes, made with reddish, greenish or brownish earth colour with water.
Museo Nazionale di San Matteo: exhibiting sculptures and paintings from the 12th to 15th centuries, among them the masterworks of Giovanni and Andrea Pisano, the Master of San Martino, Simone Martini, Nino Pisano and Masaccio.
: exhibiting the belongings of the families that lived in the palace: paintings, statues, armors, etc.
: exhibiting a collection of instruments used in science, between a pneumatic machine of Van Musschenbroek and a compass which probably belonged to Galileo Galilei.
Museo di storia naturale dell'Università di Pisa (Natural History Museum of the University of Pisa), located in the Certosa di Calci, outside the city. It houses one of the largest cetacean skeletons collection in Europe.
: temporary exhibitions and cultural activities center, located in the Lungarno, in the heart of the old town, the palace is easy recognizable because it is the only blue building.
Cantiere delle Navi di Pisa - The Pisa's Ancient Ships Archaeological Area: A museum of 10,650 square meters – 3,500 archaeological excavation, 1,700 laboratories and one restoration center – that visitors can visit with a guided tour. The Museum opened in June 2019 and has been located inside to the 16th-century Medicean Arsenals in Lungarno Ranieri Simonelli, restored under the supervision of the Tuscany Soprintendenza. It hosts a remarkable collection of ceramics and amphoras dated back from the 8th century BCE to the 2nd century BC, and also 32 ships dated back from the second century BCE and the seventh century BC. Four of them are integrally preserved and the best one is the so-called Barca C, also named Alkedo (written in the ancient Greek characters). The first boat was accidentally discovered in 1998 near the Pisa San Rossore railway station and the archeological excavations were completed 20 years later.

Churches
Baptistry
San Francesco
San Frediano
San Giorgio ai Tedeschi
San Michele in Borgo
San Nicola
San Paolo a Ripa d'Arno
San Paolo all'Orto
San Piero a Grado
San Pietro in Vinculis
San Sisto
San Tommaso delle Convertite
San Zeno
Santa Caterina
Santa Cristina
Santa Maria della Spina
Santo Sepolcro

Palaces, towers and villas
Palazzo del Collegio Puteano
Palazzo della Carovana
Palazzo delle Vedove
Torre dei Gualandi
Villa di Corliano
Leaning Tower of Pisa

Sports

Football
Football is the main sport in Pisa; the local team, A.C. Pisa, currently plays in the Serie B (the second highest football division in Italy), and has had a top flight history throughout the 1980s and the 1990s, featuring several world-class players such as Diego Simeone, Christian Vieri and Dunga during this time. The club play at the Arena Garibaldi – Stadio Romeo Anconetani, opened in 1919 and with a capacity of 25,000.

Shooting
Shooting was one of the first sports to have their own association in Pisa. The Società del Tiro a Segno di Pisa was founded on July 9, 1862. In 1885, they acquired their own training field. The shooting range was almost completely destroyed during World War II.

Transport

Airport
Pisa has an international airport known as Pisa International Airport or normally Galileo Galilei located in San Giusto neighbourhood in Pisa. It is served by twenty-one airlines connecting eleven domestic and sixty-one international destinations (seasonal included).

Pisamover
It's based on a driverless "horizontal funicular" that travels the distance in 5 minutes, with a 5-minute frequency, having an intermediate stop at parking station San Giusto/Aurelia.

Buses
Consorzio Pisano Trasporti, also known as CPT, was a Società consortile a responsabilità limitata (Scarl) that operated since 2005 the local public transport in Pisa and in the province. Became subsidiary of Compagnia Toscana Trasporti Nord in 2012 and was one the companies of the consortium ONE Scarl to accomplish the contract stipulated with the Regione Toscana for the public transport in the 2018-2019 period. The fleet consisted of 70 urban, 15 suburban and 260 intercity buses.

Since 1 November 2021 the public local transport is managed by Autolinee Toscane.

 Urban routes:

 LAM Rossa: Cisanello Hospital - Central Station – Duomo – Parking Pietrasantina
 LAM Verde: San Giusto - Central Station - Pratale
 Shuttle E: Lungarno Pacinotti – Park Brennero – La Fontina
 Night LAM: Cisanello–Lungarni (night service)
 Night LAM: Pietrasantina–Lungarni (night service)
 Shuttle Torre: Park Pietrasantina – Largo Cocco Griffi (Duomo)
 Shuttle Cisanello Hospital: Park Bocchette – Cisanello (Hospital)
 2: San Giusto – Central Station – Porta a Lucca
 4: Central Station – I Passi
 5: Putignano – Central Station – C.E.P.
 6: Central Station – C.E.P. – Barbaricina
 8: Coltano – Vittorio Emanuele II square
 12: Viale Gramsci – Ospedaletto (Expò) – Bus Depot CPT
 13: Cisanello Hospital – Piagge – Central Station – Pisanova
 14: Cisanello Hospital – Pisanova – Central Station – Piagge
 16: Viale Gramsci – Ospedaletto – Industrial Zone (some to Località Montacchiello)
 21: Airport – Central Station – C.E.P.–Duomo – I Passi (night service)
 22: Central Station – Piagge–Pisanova–Cisanello–Pratale (night service)

 Suburban routes to/from Pisa:

 10: Pisa–Tirrenia–Livorno (deviation to La Vettola - San Piero a Grado)
 50: Pisa–Collesalvetti–Fauglia–Crespina
 51: Collesalvetti–Lorenzana–Orciano
 70: Pisa–Gello–Pontasserchio
 71: Pisa – Sant'Andrea in Palazzi – Pontasserchio – San Martino Ulmiano: Pisa
 80: Pisa–Migliarino–Vecchiano–Filettole
 81: Pisa–Pontasserchio–Vecchiano
 110: Pisa–Asciano–Agnano
 120: Pisa–Calci–Montemagno
 140: Pisa–Vicopisano–Pontedera
 150: Pisa–Musigliano–Pettori
 160: Pisa–Navacchio–Calci – Tre Colli
 190: Pisa–Cascina–Pontedera
 875: Pisa – Arena Metato

Trains
The city is served by two railway stations available for passengers: Pisa Centrale and Pisa San Rossore.

Pisa Centrale is the main railway station and is located along the Tyrrhenic railway line. It connects Pisa directly with several other important Italian cities such as Rome, Florence, Genoa, Turin, Naples, Livorno, and Grosseto.

Pisa San Rossore links the city with Lucca (20 minutes north-east of Pisa) and Viareggio and is also reachable from Pisa Centrale. It is a minor railway station located near the Leaning Tower zone.

There was another station called Pisa Aeroporto situated next to the Airport with services to Pisa Centrale and Florence. It was closed on December 15, 2013, for the realization of a people mover.

Motorway
Pisa is connected to Autostrada A11 from Florence and to Autostrada A12 linking Genoa-Rosignano with exit Pisa Nord and Pisa Centro – Airport.

Education
Pisa hosts the University of Pisa, especially renowned in the fields of Physics, Mathematics, Engineering and Computer Science.

Construction of a new leaning tower of glass and steel 57 meters tall, containing offices and apartments was scheduled to start in summer 2004 and take 4 years. It was designed by Dante Oscar Benini and raised criticism.

The Scuola Normale Superiore di Pisa was founded in 1810, by Napoleonic decree, as a branch of the École Normale Supérieure of Paris. Recognized as a "national university" in 1862, one year after Italian unification, and named during that period as "Normal School of the Kingdom of Italy" (Superior Graduate Schools in Italy i.e. Scuola Superiore Universitaria).
Located at: Scuola Normale Superiore di Pisa – Piazza dei Cavalieri, 7 – 56126 Pisa (Italia)

 The Sant'Anna School of Advanced Studies of Pisa or Scuola Superiore Sant'Anna is a special-statute public university located in Pisa, Italy, emerging from Scuola Normale Superiore di Pisa and operating in the field of applied sciences, (Superior Graduate Schools in Italy i.e. Scuola Superiore Universitaria)
Located at: Scuola Superiore Sant'Anna, P.zza Martiri della Libertà, 33 – 56127 – Pisa (Italia)

 The University of Pisa or Università di Pisa, is one of the oldest universities in Italy. It was formally founded on September 3, 1343, by an edict of Pope Clement VI, although there had been lectures on law in Pisa since the 11th century. The university has Europe's oldest academic botanical garden i.e. Orto botanico di Pisa, founded 1544. The medical school of the university is sight at Azienda ospedaliero-universitaria pisana.
Located at: Università di Pisa – Lungarno Pacinotti, 43 – 56126 Pisa (Italia)

Notable people
For people born in Pisa, see People from the Province of Pisa; among notable non-natives long resident in the city:

 Giuliano Amato (born 1938), politician, former Premier and Minister of Interior Affairs
 Alessandro d'Ancona (1835–1914), critic and writer.
 Silvano Arieti (1914–1981), psychiatrist
 Gaetano Bardini (1926–2017), tenor
 Andrea Bocelli (born 1958), tenor and multi-instrumentalist.
 Giosuè Carducci (1835–1907), poet and 1906 Nobel Prize in Literature winner.
 Massimo Carmassi (born 1943), architect
 Carlo Azeglio Ciampi (1920–2016), politician, former President of the Republic of Italy
 Maria Luisa Cicci (1760–1794), poet
 Giovanni Carlo Maria Clari (1677–1754), a musical composer and maestro di cappella at Pistoia.
 Alessio Corti (born 1965), mathematician
 Rustichello da Pisa (born 13th century), writer
 Giovanni Battista Donati (1826–1873), an Italian astronomer.
 Leonardo Fibonacci (1170–1250), mathematician.
 Galileo Galilei (1564–1642), physicist.
 Giovanni Gentile (1875–1944), philosopher and politician
 Orazio Gentileschi (1563–1639), painter.
 Count Ugolino della Gherardesca (1214–1289), noble (see also Dante Alighieri).
 Giovanni Gronchi (1887–1978), politician, former President of the Republic of Italy
 Giacomo Leopardi [1798–1837), poet and philosopher.
 Enrico Letta (born 1966), politician, former Prime Minister of Italy
 Marco Malvaldi (born 1974), mystery novelist
 Leonardo Ortolani (born 1967), comic writer
 Antonio Pacinotti (1841–1912), physicist, inventor of the dynamo
 Andrea Pisano (1290–1348), a sculptor and architect.
 Afro Poli (1902–1988), an operatic baritone
 Bruno Pontecorvo  (1913–1993), nuclear physicist
 Gillo Pontecorvo (1919–2006), filmmaker
 Ippolito Rosellini (1800–1843), an Egyptologist.
 Paolo Savi (1798–1871), geologist and ornithologist.
 Antonio Tabucchi (1943–2012), writer and academic

Sport 
 Jason Acuña (born 1973), Stunt performer
 Sergio Bertoni (1915–1995), footballer
 Giorgio Chiellini (born 1984), footballer
 Camila Giorgi (born 1991), tennis player

Sister cities

Pisa is twinned with:

 Acre, Israel (1988)
 Akademgorodok (Novosibirsk), Russia (1991)
 Angers, France (1982)
 Hangzhou, China (2008)
 Iglesias, Italy (2009)
 Jericho, Palestine (2000)
 Kolding, Denmark (2007)
 Niles, United States (1991)
 Ocala, United States (2004)
 Rhodes, Greece (2009)
 Santiago de Compostela, Spain (2009)
 Unna, Germany (1996)

References

Notes

Bibliography

 Official Abitants statistics
 Pisa Metropolitan Area

External links

 Portal of Pisa
 Pisan history portal
 Official site of the Pisa Tourist Board
 Official site of the Municipality of Pisa, including webcams
 Moving Postcards of Pisa 
 Pisa Guide
 A comprehensive guide of Pisa

 
Coastal towns in Tuscany
Municipalities of the Province of Pisa
Gothic sites in Tuscany
Romanesque architecture in Tuscany

the centre of mass of the leaning tower of pisa is located in the 4th floor (not american system)